The Qashqadaryo or Kashkadarya is a river in southern Uzbekistan. It disappears in the Qarshi Steppe.

By the river is the city of Qarshi, the capital of the Qashqadaryo Region, which lies within the basin of the river.

The river takes some water from Zeravshan River via the Eskianhor (Эскианхор) canal and forms the Chimkurgan reservoir.

References

Rivers of Uzbekistan